The Les petits baigneurs is a monument in Montreal, Quebec, Canada. Designed by Alfred Laliberté, it was unveiled in 1916 at the entrance to the Maisonneuve public baths in Montreal. The monument was later restored in 1992. It is on Morgan Avenue, close to the La Fermière monument.

References

External links
 Les petits baigneurs

1916 sculptures
History of Montreal
Monuments and memorials in Montreal
Fountains in Canada
1916 in Canada
Bronze sculptures in Canada
Statues in Canada
Outdoor sculptures in Montreal